Panos Andreas Panay (born June 25, 1972) is a Cyprus-born entrepreneur, executive and author. Panay is currently the Senior Vice President of Global Strategy & Innovation at Berklee College of Music. He is the founding Managing Director of Berklee Institute for Creative Entrepreneurship, and the founder of online platform Sonicbids.

Education 
Panay has a Music Business & Management degree from Berklee College of Music, where he studied with Lauren Passarelli.

Career 
Panay began his career as talent agent at Ted Kurland Associates responsible for the international tours of artists including Chick Corea and Pat Metheny.

In 2000, Panay started the company Sonicbids as of way of enabling independent artists to connect with music promoters online, using Electronic Press Kits (EPK) as a means of booking bands. Panay founded the company in his apartment in Newton, MA. The company later acquired ArtistData. Panay led the company as CEO for 13 years, until after its acquisition by Backstage LLC, in a deal backed by Guggenheim Partners.

In 2013, after the sale of Sonicbids, Panay joined Berklee college to found the Berklee Institute for Creative Entrepreneurship (BerkleeICE). Among the institute's many activities are joint classes with MIT and the design firm IDEO, a summer high school program in collaboration with Brown University, sponsored internships, research projects including Rethink Music's Fair Music Report, online courses and other engagements meant to get students ready for careers.

In June 2016, Panay co-founded the non-profit Open Music Initiative, in collaboration with the MIT Media Lab, and individuals including inventor Dan Harple and IDEO partner Michael Hendrix.

Panay is currently the Senior Vice President, Global Strategy & Innovation at Berklee College of Music. In this role, Panay leads Berklee’s global strategy to create an interconnected ecosystem of campuses, centers, and partnerships across the world that foster and inspire new artistic expressions, idioms, and ideas through leading pedagogy; development of cross-cultural fluency and creative capacity; and seamless integration of technology and online learning. He oversees Berklee’s campus in Valencia, Spain; BerkleeNYC; Global Initiatives; the Berklee Institute for Creative Entrepreneurship; the Berklee India Exchange; the Berklee Music and Health Institute; Berklee’s institutional strategy; and Berklee’s global partnerships.

In August 2019, Panay was named an MIT Connection Science Fellow.

In February 2020, Panay opened Berklee Abu Dhabi developed in partnership with the Abu Dhabi Department of Culture and Tourism. The partnership encompasses $5 million in fellowships, through which students from the Middle East/North Africa (MENA) region will be given opportunities to attend Berklee College of Music; Boston Conservatory at Berklee; Berklee's campus in Valencia, Spain; Berklee Online; and summer programs, and to have an impact on the life of Berklee internationally.

Writing and speaking 
Panay has written about startups and entrepreneurship for blogs and publications including Huffington Post, Forbes, Entrepreneir, WSJ Accelerators and Fast Company. He has spoken at a TEDx event. He also spoke in the podcast Shaping Business Minds Through Art.

In 2021, Panay and R. Michael Hendrix, global design director at IDEO, co-wrote and published Two Beats Ahead (PublicAffairs, US and Penguin Business, UK), a book that covers what the musical mind has to teach about innovation, featuring interviews with top creatives including Pharrell Williams, Justin Timberlake, Gloria Estefan, Imogen Heap, Radiohead, T Bone Burnett, Hank Shocklee (co-founder of Public Enemy), and Jimmy Iovine.

Awards and honors 
Panay was awarded the Fast Company's "Fast 50" honor, Boston Business Journal's "40 under 40" and BosInno "50 on Fire" Award for excellence in education.

Personal life 
Panay lives with his wife and twin daughters in Watertown, Massachusetts.

His first cousin, Panos (Costa) Panay, is an executive at Microsoft.

References 

1972 births
Living people
Berklee College of Music alumni
Cypriot businesspeople